Kachap-e Olya (also Romanized as Kachap-e ‘Olyā; also known as Kachab-e Bālā) is a village in Dabuy-ye Jonubi Rural District, Dabudasht District, Amol County, Mazandaran Province, Iran. At the 2006 census, its population was 648, in 185 families.

References 

Populated places in Amol County